Smoked Out Music: Greatest Hits is a compilation album by hip-hop group Three 6 Mafia. The album features tracks that span the full history of the group up until the album's release. The first track on the album, "When It's On, It's Murder", is a previously unreleased song, while the rest are lifted from previous album releases. 

The album also contains a bonus second disk that features a mix of 15 untitled tracks that are "dragged-n-chopped" by DJ Black.

Track listing

Main Disk 

All tracks are produced by DJ Paul and Juicy J
{{Track listing
"When It's On It's Murder" - Garfield ft. Project Pat & The Kaze
"Break Da Law" - Dj Paul & The Kaze
"Where Is Da Buck" - Mighty Marshall Song & Mighty Skye Song
"Love to Make A Stang" - Zach Williams
"Grab Da Gauge" - Jessie Play & Manny Play
"Jealous Azz Bitch" - Mickey Mouse Club House
"Liquor & Bud" - DJ Paul
"Nine to Yo Dome" - Project Pat (featuring Gooniqua and Goostin)
"Ridin' 'N' “Tha” Chevy, Part 2 (tour version)" - DJ Paul & Lord Infamous ft. Juicy J, Zach Williams
"Playa Hataz (Original)" - Jessie Play
"Half on a Sick or Some Blow (ft. Juicy J, DJ Paul, Lord Infamous, Mighty Marshall, Mighty Chase, Mighty Skye, Austin & Mighty Everest)" - Lil E a.k.a. Mac E
"Now I High, Really High (Original) (ft. MEGA Gummy Bear)" - Koopsta Knicca & Gangsta Blac
"Gimme Head" - Juicy J
"DJ Black Outro" - Triple Six Mafia
| total_length = 59:01
| note = 
}}

Smoked Out Music and Provident Label Group (2018)

1. When It's On It's Murder (Garfield Song)
2. Break Da Law (High Pitch)
3.  To The Ourselves and Them (Low Pitch)
4. Many More
5. Liquor & Bud
6. House Of Da Lord
7. Fear Is A Liar
8. Ridin' 'N' "Tha" Chevy
9. Survivor
10. Slob On My Knob, Part 1
11. 2014
12. Blow a Nigga Ass Off, Part 2

Charts

References 

2006 greatest hits albums
Three 6 Mafia compilation albums
Albums produced by DJ Paul
Albums produced by Juicy J